Flying horses are horses that fly.

Flying horses or flying horse or variation, may refer to:

 Carousel, a fairground ride also sometimes known as "flying horses"
 Gansu Flying Horse, a Han dynasty Chinese bronze statue
 Lipizzan, an Austrian breed of horses renowned for their "airs above the ground"

Places and facilities
 Flying Horse Walk, a shopping arcade in Nottingham City Centre, Nottingham, England, UK
 Flying Horse Inn, a pub in Nottingham, England, UK
 Flying Horses Carousel, a merry-go-round on Martha's Vineyard Island, Massachusetts

Music
 The Flying Horse Big Band, a band at the University of Central Florida
 Flying Horse Records, the jazz music label of the University of Central Florida
 Flying Horse: the Dawn of a Man, an EP by the heavy metal band Velvet Moonlight
 "Flying Horse" (song), a song from the eponymous EP by the heavy metal band Velvet Moonlight
 "Flying Horses", a song by Dispatch on the album Silent Steeples
 Flying Hórses, the stage name of Canadian musician Jade Bergeron

Other uses
 Flying Horse Royal Lager, a beer produced by the United Breweries Group

See also
 List of winged horses
 Tianma, East Asian mythological sky-treading horse
 Winged horse (disambiguation)
 Pegasus (disambiguation)
 Horse (disambiguation)